Baptiste Buntschu (born 26 February 1990) is a Swiss professional footballer currently playing for VfL Halle 96.

External links
 

1990 births
Living people
Swiss men's footballers
FC Lausanne-Sport players
FC Stade Nyonnais players
SR Delémont players
Association football defenders
FC Fribourg players